The Estadio USBI is a multi-use stadium located in Xalapa, Veracruz. It is currently used mostly for American football matches  The stadium has a capacity of 4,000 people.

References

External links

Sports venues in Veracruz
USBI
Athletics (track and field) venues in Mexico
College American football venues in Mexico